Kachewani railway station serves Kachewani  and surrounding villages in Bhandara district and Gondia district in Maharashtra, India.

References

Railway stations in Gondia district
Bhandara district